Kernel may refer to:

Computing
 Kernel (operating system), the central component of most operating systems
 Kernel (image processing), a matrix used for image convolution
 Compute kernel, in GPGPU programming
 Kernel method, in machine learning
 Kernelization, a technique for designing efficient algorithms
 Kernel, a routine that is executed in a vectorized loop, for example in general-purpose computing on graphics processing units
KERNAL, the Commodore operating system

Mathematics

Objects
 Kernel (algebra), a general concept that includes:
 Kernel (linear algebra) or null space, a set of vectors mapped to the zero vector
 Kernel (category theory), a generalization of the kernel of a homomorphism
 Kernel (set theory), an equivalence relation: partition by image under a function
 Difference kernel, a binary equalizer: the kernel of the difference of two functions

Functions
 Kernel (geometry), the set of points within a polygon from which the whole polygon boundary is visible
 Kernel (statistics), a weighting function used in kernel density estimation to estimate the probability density function of a random variable
 Integral kernel or kernel function, a function of two variables that defines an integral transform
 Heat kernel, the fundamental solution to the heat equation on a specified domain
 Convolution kernel
 Stochastic kernel, the transition function of a stochastic process
 Transition kernel, a generalization of a stochastic kernel
 Pricing kernel, the stochastic discount factor used in mathematical finance
 Positive-definite kernel, a generalization of a positive-definite matrix
 Kernel trick, in statistics
 Reproducing kernel Hilbert space

Science
 Seed, inside the nut of most plants or the fruitstone of drupes, especially:
 Apricot kernel
 Corn kernel
 Palm kernel
 Wheat kernel
 Atomic nucleus, the center of an atom

Companies
 Kernel (agriculture company), a Ukrainian producer of sunflower oil
 Kernel (neurotechnology company), a developer of neural interfaces
 The Kernel Brewery, a craft brewery in London
 The Kernel, an Internet culture website, now part of The Daily Dot

Other uses
 Kernel (EP), by the band Seam
 Kernel Fleck, a character in The Demonata series of books
 Brigitte Kernel (born 1959), French journalist and writer

See also
 Colonel, a senior military officer